In Bayesian statistics, the Probability of Direction (pd) is a measure of effect existence representing the certainty with which an effect is positive or negative. This index is numerically similar to the frequentist p-value.

Definition
It is mathematically defined as the proportion of the  posterior distribution that is of the median's sign. It typically varies between 50% and 100%.

History
The original formulation of this index and its usage in Bayesian statistics can be found in the psycho software documentation by Dominique Makowski under the appellation Maximum Probability of Effect (MPE). It was later renamed Probability of Direction and implemented in the easystats collection of software. Similar formulations have also been described in the context of bootstrapped parameters interpretation.

Properties
The probability of direction is typically independent of the statistical model, as it is solely based on the posterior distribution and does not require any additional information from the data or the model. Contrary to indices related to the Region of Practical Interest (ROPE), it is robust to the scale of both the response variable and the predictors. However, similarly to its frequentist counterpart - the p-value, this index is not able to quantify evidence in favor of the null hypothesis. Advantages and limitations of the probability of direction have been studied by comparing it to other indices including the Bayes factor or Bayesian Equivalence test.

Relationship with p-value
The probability of direction has a direct correspondence with the frequentist one-sided p-value through the formula  and to the two-sided p-value through the formula . Thus, a two-sided p-value of respectively .1, .05, .01 and .001 would correspond approximately to a pd of 95%, 97.5%, 99.5% and 99.95%. The proximity between the pd and the p-value is in line with the interpretation of the former as an index of effect existence, as it follows the original definition of the p-value.

Interpretation
The bayestestR package for R suggests the following rule of thumb guidelines:

 style="text-align: left; margin-left: auto; margin-right: auto; border: none;"
! pd !! p-value equivalence !! Interpretation
|-
|  ||  || Uncertain
|-
|  ||  || Possibly existing
|-
|  ||  || Likely existing
|-
|  ||  || Probably existing
|-
|  ||  || Certainly existing
|-
|}

See also 

 Bayes factor
 Equivalence test
 p-value

References

External links 
 bayestestR — an R package for computing Bayesian indices

Bayesian statistics
Probability and statistics